St Edmund's College (known colloquially as Eddies) is an independent Catholic secondary day school for boys', located in Ipswich, Queensland, Australia. The school was founded by the Congregation of Christian Brothers in 1892 and is conducted in the tradition of Edmund Ignatius Rice.

The school is member of the Associated Independent Colleges of the Greater Brisbane region along with Marist College Ashgrove, Iona College, Padua College, Villanova College, St Patrick's College, St Laurence's College and St. Peters Lutheran College.

St Edmund's College accepts students from Years 7 to 12, drawing from a wide area of Ipswich. The total enrolment of the school is projected to be approximately 1,500 students.

The original St Edmunds Christian Brothers building is now used by St Mary's Primary School, still located on the corner of Mary & Elizabeth St, Woodend, besides the church. In fact, to this day the heritage listed gate at that stone wall still features the original St Edmunds initials CBC (Christian Brothers College).

Skool 2 Skoolies 
The Skool 2 Skoolies initiative began in 2003, when one Year 12 St Edmund's student pledged to cycle  to the Gold Coast on his last day of school. His primary mission was to raise funds for charity.

Sport 
St. Edmund's is a member of the Associated Independent Colleges (AIC).
 Season 1 February - March: Swimming, Cricket, Volleyball, AFL	
 Season 2 April - June: Chess, Cross Country, Rugby Union, Soccer 	
 Season 3 July - October: Hockey, Cross Country, Track and Field, Basketball, Tennis, Rugby League
 Season 4 October - November: Track and Field, Golf

AIC sports include: Australian rules, basketball, chess, cricket, cross country, rugby union (St Edmund's College Ipswich was selected to represent Australia at the prestigious Sanix World Rugby Youth Invitational Tournament in Fukuoka, Japan during 2003), soccer, swimming, tennis, track & field, volleyball, hockey, and rugby league. Non-AIC sports include: e-sports, golf, hockey, and orienteering.

AIC premierships 
St Edmund's College has won the following AIC premierships.

 Athletics (3) - 2012, 2013, 2014
 Basketball (5) - 2001, 2002, 2006, 2017, 2020
 Rugby (2) - 2011, 2014
 Soccer - 2016
 Tennis - 2005
 Volleyball (5) - 1999, 2003, 2005, 2008, 2011

Musical and drama productions 
Each year, since 2007, a full musical production is conducted, in conjunction with St. Mary's College, Ipswich. The host school alternates every year.

Musicals 
 2023 (SEC) - 'The Addams Family'
 2022 (SMC) - ‘High School Musical - on Stage’ 
 2021 (SEC) - 'School of Rock' 
 2019 (SMC) - 'Matilda the musical' 
 2018 (SEC) - 'Rock of Ages 101: High School Edition' 
 2017 (SMC) - 'Hairspray' 
 2016 (SEC) - 'The Wiz' 
 2015 (SMC) - 'Legally Blonde: The Musical' 
 2014 (SEC) - 'West Side Story' 
 2013 (SMC) - 'The Bells of St Mary's' 
 2012 (SEC) - '13'
 2011 (SMC) - 'Fame'
 2010 (SEC) - 'Footloose'
 2009 (SMC) - 'High School Musical'
 2008 (SEC) - 'Grease'
 2007 (SMC) - 'Thoroughly Modern Millie'
 1993 (SEC) - 'Half a Sixpence'
 1992 (SEC) - 'The Pirates of Penzance'
 1991 (SEC) - '¡Viva México! (El grito de Dolores)'
 1990 (SEC) - 'Pippin'
 1989 (SEC) - 'Oklahoma'

Houses 
In 1981, Eddies decided to add school houses. These houses being, Hogan, Ryles, Carroll and Stevens, all being named after previous principles of the school. 

In 1995, the four houses at St Edmunds changed their names. This also coincided with the college moving from Year levels to a Pastoral System.
Hogan became Rice (yellow)
Ryall became Callan (green)
Carroll became Morgan (blue)
Stevens became Treacy (red)

In 2003, due to an increase in student numbers, these house were split in half creating 8 houses; Callan 1, Callan 2, Rice 1, Rice 2, Morgan 1, Morgan 2, Treacy 1 & Treacy 2.

At the end of 2006, further change came when these eight houses were folded into six the following year, meaning two new houses were created, Finn & Ambrose. Those six houses at the college were; Ambrose, Callan, Finn, Morgan, Rice & Treacy.

In 2013, two more houses were created in preparation of Year 7 returning to St Edmunds College in 2015. These two house were named Ignatius and Elliott.

Principals 
 Joseph Morgan  -  1892 - 1894
 J.D. O'Donaghe  -  1895 - 1898
 W.J. Hogan  -  1899 - 1901, 1905 - 1907
 R.X. Butler  -  1902 - 1904
 J.F. O'Brien  -  1908 - 1914, 1931 - 1936, 1939
 F. Donovan  -  1915 - 1918
 T.C. Seery  -  1919
 B. O'Ryan  -  1920 - 1924
 M.C. Carroll  -  1925 - 1930
 S.L. Carroll  -  1937 - 1938 
 J.C. Stevens  -  1940 - 1941
 H.A. Segrave  -  1942
 R.G. McCartney  -  1943 - 1945
 F.C. Walsh  -  1946 - 1948 
 N.G. Wigmore  -  1949 - 1951
 G.E. Ryall  -  1952 - 1954 
 W.A. Lewis  -  1955 - 1960
 B.M. Shortill  -  1961 - 1966
 K.F. Lynch  -  1967 - 1971 
 A.I. Schofield  -  1972 - 1977
 L.E. "Ted" Magee  -  1978 - 1983, 1994 - 1998
 R.M. Reardon  -  1984 - 1989 
 R.O. Grundy  -  1990 - 1992
 Jim Lucey  -  1999 - 2004 
 Brendan Lawler - 2005 - 2013 
 Christopher Leadbetter  -  2014 - 2017 
 Diarmuid O'Riordan   -  2018 - 2020 
 Raymond Celegato  -  2021–present

Notable alumni 

Entertainment, media and the arts
 John Birminghamauthor
 d'Arcy Doyleartist
 Nathan Kneen – original member from The Ten Tenors
 Rhys Leeartist

Politics and the law
 Matthew Hickey barrister and founding member and producer of The Ten Tenors
 Jim Maddensolicitor and Member for Ipswich West
 Henry Palaszczukformer Member of the Queensland Legislative Assembly for Inala and Beattie Government Minister; father of Queensland Premier Annastacia Palaszczuk
 Paul Pisasaleformer Mayor of Ipswich

Sport
 Denis Flanneryrugby league player
 Peter Gallagherrugby league player
 Joshua Hardingbaseball player 
 Noel Kellyrugby league player
 Jeff McLeanrugby union player

 Paul McLean rugby union player and official 
 Peter McMahon swimmer and businessman
 Heath RamsayOlympic swimmer
 Grant SorensenOlympic volleyball player
 James Stannardrugby union player

See also 

 List of schools in Queensland
 Catholic education in Australia

References

External links 
 St Edmund's College website

Congregation of Christian Brothers secondary schools in Australia
Catholic secondary schools in Queensland
Boys' schools in Queensland
Educational institutions established in 1892
Schools in Ipswich, Queensland
1892 establishments in Australia